A variety of newspapers are called Sentinel or The Sentinel, including:

 The Daily Sentinel (Texas), based in Nacogdoches, Texas
 Daily Sitka Sentinel, based in Sitka, Alaska
 Grand Junction Daily Sentinel, published in western Colorado
 Hanford Sentinel, published by Scripps League Newspapers in Hanford, California
 Jewish Sentinel, or simply,  The Sentinel, newspaper. 
 The Holland Sentinel, published in Holland, Michigan
 Knoxville News Sentinel, published in Knoxville, Tennessee
 Los Angeles Sentinel, published in Los Angeles, California
 Mendon-Honeoye Falls-Lima Sentinel, published in Mendon, New York
 Milwaukee Journal Sentinel, published in Milwaukee, Wisconsin
 Montgomery County Sentinel, published in Montgomery County, Maryland
 New York Daily Sentinel, America’s first daily labor newspaper
 The News-Sentinel, published in Fort Wayne, Indiana
 Orlando Sentinel, published in Orlando, Florida
 Rochester Sentinel (disambiguation), various newspapers
 San Francisco Sentinel, published in San Francisco, California
 Santa Cruz Sentinel, published in Santa Cruz, California
 Sentinel, a group of local newspapers in Essex and Monmouth counties, New Jersey, published by Greater Media
 The Sentinel, a weekly newspaper published in Sangamon County, Illinois
 Sentinel (Fairmont), published in Fairmont, Martin County, Minnesota
 The Sentinel (Guwahati), an English daily newspaper with four editions in Assam and nearby Northeastern India
 The Sentinel (KSU), student newspaper of Kennesaw State University published in Kennesaw, Georgia
 The Sentinel (Pennsylvania), published in Carlisle, Pennsylvania
 The Sentinel (Rockhurst University), the official student newspaper of Rockhurst University
 The Sentinel (Staffordshire), published in Stoke-on-Trent, England
 St. Louis Sentinel, published in St. Louis, Missouri
 Sun-Sentinel, published in Fort Lauderdale, Florida and Broward County
 The Valley Sentinel'', published in Valemount, British Columbia, Canada

Lists of newspapers